Huis ten Bosch is a Royal palace in The Hague, Netherlands and the former home of Queen Beatrix of The Netherlands.

Huis ten Bosch or Huis Ten Bosch may also refer to:

 Huis Ten Bosch (theme park), a Dutch theme park in Nagasaki, Japan
 Huis Ten Bosch (train), the train service between Fukuoka and the Huis Ten Bosch theme park
 Huis Ten Bosch Station

See also
 Bosch (disambiguation)